Pirateer is a spatial board game for two to four players created by Scott Peterson in 1978. The game was originally named Privateer, before being published by the Mendocino Game Company in 1995. The name of the game is apparently a combination of privateer and pirate.

Gameplay
The objective of the game is for a player to either: return the centrally located treasure to their home port, or to capture all of their opponents' three ships, using movement restricted by dice rolls (two six-sided dice), obstacles, trade winds, and currents.

The theme of the game is for each player to assume the role of a different band of three ships, with their own port and flag.

Mendocino Game Company and lawsuit

The aptly named Mendocino Game Company, based in Mendocino County, California, began publishing Pirateer in 1995.

In 2002, the Mendocino Game Company ceased producing Pirateer. The designer of the game, Scott Peterson, unsuccessfully sued board members for misappropriating trade secrets, breaching their fiduciary duty and conspiring to seize control of the company. The board members counter-sued and, in 2009, a Mendocino County jury ordered Scott Peterson to pay $791,000 to investors and members of the company’s board of directors in restitution and punitive damages for defamation.

Critical reception
Forrest Johnson reviewed the original 1978 version of Privateer in The Space Gamer magazine, no. 39. He commented on the game by saying, "Simple, but not dull, Privateer takes almost no thought at all. A good game to bring out after the bottle has gone around a couple of times."

In 1996, Pirateer was one of just five board games to win the Mensa Select Award. It was also named "Game of the Year" by John Kovalic of the Wisconsin State Journal, while film critic Mick LaSalle of the San Francisco Chronicle called it "addictive" and Phil Bettel of the Chicago Tribune gave high marks to the instructions.

Further reading 

 "Toy Fair Tales and Inventor Chronicles: Scott Peterson"

References

Board games introduced in 1978
Board game publishing companies
Game manufacturers